was a politician and cabinet minister in the pre-war Empire of Japan.

Nakashōji was a graduate of the Osaka Prefectural Kitano High School. After graduating from the Kaisei Academy, he worked for a period as court-appointed attorney in the lower court system, and subsequently as a legal councilor in the Court of Appeals and assessor in the Administrative Court system. Afterwards, he entered the central government bureaucracy, and served in various capacities within the Ministry of Communications and Home Ministry. He was selected as Minister of Agriculture and Commerce under the 3rd Katsura administration from 1912 to 1913, and again to the same portfolio under the Terauchi administration from 1916 to 1918. He was later appointed to a seat in the Upper House of the Diet of Japan, and served on the Privy Council.

 
 

1865 births
1924 deaths
Government ministers of Japan
Kaisei Academy alumni
Members of the House of Peers (Japan)